Tolmetothrips is a genus of Thrips (order Thysanoptera) in the family Phlaeothripidae.

Species
 Tolmetothrips granti
 Tolmetothrips smilacis

References

Phlaeothripidae
Thrips
Thrips genera